The Rotax 618 is a  two-stroke, two-cylinder, liquid cooled, gear reduction-drive engine that was formerly manufactured by BRP-Rotax GmbH & Co. KG. It was designed for use on ultralight aircraft.

Development

The 618 features liquid-cooled cylinder heads and cylinders with a rotary valve inlet and an exhaust valve. Cooling is via one or two externally mounted radiators. Lubrication is by use of pre-mixed fuel and oil at 50:1 or oil injection. The 618 has dual Ducati capacitor discharge ignition systems and is equipped with two piston-type carburetors. It uses a manifold-driven pneumatic fuel pump to provide fuel pressure.

The engine's propeller drive is via a Rotax type C or E style gearbox. The standard engine includes a muffler exhaust system and an intake silencer and filter, with an after muffler also available to further reduce engine noise. The standard starter is an electric starter. An integral alternating current generator produces 12 volts and 200 watts.

The Rotax 618 is no longer in production.

Applications

Specifications (Rotax 618)

See also
Rotax aircraft engines

References

Two-stroke aircraft piston engines
Rotax engines